Typophorus is a genus of leaf beetles in the subfamily Eumolpinae. There are at least 52 described species in Typophorus. Similar genera include Paria and Tijucana. Typophorus itself is probably polyphyletic.

Two subspecies of Typophorus nigritus, T. nigritus nitidulus and T. nigritus viridicyaneus, are known as pests of sweet potatoes.

Species

 Typophorus annulatus Lefèvre, 1877
 Typophorus apicicornis Jacoby, 1891
 Typophorus appendiculatus Bechyné, 1948
 Typophorus atomarius Lefèvre, 1884
 Typophorus basalis Baly, 1859
 Typophorus biplagiatus Boheman, 1858
 Typophorus bisignatus Lefèvre, 1876
 Typophorus bohumilae Bechyné, 1951
 Typophorus centromaculatus Lefèvre, 1888
 Typophorus cyanipennis Lefèvre, 1876
 Typophorus diomedes Bechyné, 1955
 Typophorus erythocephalus Jacoby, 1882
 Typophorus exaequatus Bechyné, 1951
 Typophorus exilis Lefèvre, 1878
 Typophorus fasciatus (Germar, 1824)
 Typophorus florigradus Bechyné & Bechyné, 1961
 Typophorus furvus Lefèvre, 1885
 Typophorus inflatus Bechyné, 1958
 Typophorus intermedius Lefèvre, 1876
 Typophorus interstitalis Jacoby, 1891
 Typophorus jacobyi Lefèvre, 1884
 Typophorus jacobyi atramentaria (Weise, 1921)
 Typophorus jacobyi jacobyi Lefèvre, 1884
 Typophorus kuscheli Bechyné, 1951
 Typophorus lar (Fabricius, 1787)
 Typophorus limbatus Jacoby, 1891
 Typophorus maculigera (Lefèvre, 1888)
 Typophorus mansuetus Bechyné & Bechyné, 1961
 Typophorus melanocephalus Jacoby, 1876
 Typophorus mexicanus Jacoby, 1876
 Typophorus minutus Lefèvre, 1876
 Typophorus nanus Lefèvre, 1877
 Typophorus nigra (Weise, 1921)
 Typophorus nigricollis Jacoby, 1882
 Typophorus nigritarsis (Jacoby, 1882)
 Typophorus nigritus (Fabricius, 1801)
 Typophorus nigritus chalceus Lefèvre, 1877
 Typophorus nigritus coronadoi Bechyné, 1948
 Typophorus nigritus cretifer Bechyné, 1953
 Typophorus nigritus erbeni Bechyné, 1948
 Typophorus nigritus interpositus Bechyné, 1951
 Typophorus nigritus lucens Bechyné, 1953
 Typophorus nigritus molnari Bechyné, 1953
 Typophorus nigritus nigritus (Fabricius, 1801)
 Typophorus nigritus nitidulus (Fabricius, 1801)
 Typophorus nigritus obliquus Baly, 1859
 Typophorus nigritus paradoxus Jacoby, 1882
 Typophorus nigritus punctatissimus Bechyné, 1948
 Typophorus nigritus viridicyaneus (Crotch, 1873) (sweetpotato leaf beetle)
 Typophorus picimanus Lefèvre, 1877
 Typophorus pumilus (LeConte, 1859)
 Typophorus purulenis Jacoby, 1882
 Typophorus pygmaeus Lefèvre, 1884
 Typophorus quinquemaculatus Erichson, 1847
 Typophorus rufipes Lefèvre, 1877
 Typophorus santaremus Bechyné, 1955
 Typophorus scheerpeltzi Bechyné, 1951
 Typophorus sericeus Bechyné, 1948
 Typophorus signatus Lefèvre, 1891
 Typophorus simplex Lefèvre, 1884
 Typophorus spadiceus Lefèvre, 1876
 Typophorus steinheili Lefèvre, 1878
 Typophorus subbrunneus Jacoby, 1882
 Typophorus sulcifer Bechyné, 1954
 Typophorus tarsalis Lefèvre, 1888
 Typophorus tibialis Lefèvre, 1877
 Typophorus variabilis Jacoby, 1882

incertae sedis species:
 Typophorus variabilis (Fabricius, 1801)

Species moved to Paria:
 Typophorus aeneipennis Baly, 1878
 Typophorus atripennis Lefèvre, 1878
 Typophorus corumbanus Bechyné, 1951
 Typophorus epimeralis Bechyné, 1955
 Typophorus erythopus Lefèvre, 1888
 Typophorus festinatus Bechyné, 1950
 Typophorus fulvipennis Lefèvre, 1884
 Typophorus geniculatus Lefèvre, 1878
 Typophorus horvathi Bechyné, 1955
 Typophorus montanellus Bechyné, 1951
 Typophorus nigripennis Lefèvre, 1884
 Typophorus nigronotatus Lefèvre, 1877
 Typophorus pusillus Lefèvre, 1876
 Typophorus quadriplagiatus Jacoby, 1876
 Typophorus tinctus Bechyné, 1957

Species moved to Entreriosa:
 Typophorus umbratus Lefèvre, 1877

Synonyms:
 Typophorus histrio Lefèvre, 1877: synonym of Paria opacicollis LeConte, 1859
 Typophorus nobilis Lefèvre, 1877: synonym of Typophorus basalis Baly, 1859
 Typophorus sturmi Lefèvre, 1877: synonym of Typophorus nigritus chalceus Lefèvre, 1877
 Typophorus versutus Lefèvre, 1877: synonym of Typophorus nigritus nitidulus (Fabricius, 1801)

References

Further reading

External links

 

Eumolpinae
Chrysomelidae genera
Beetles of North America
Beetles of South America
Taxa named by Louis Alexandre Auguste Chevrolat
Articles created by Qbugbot